Goldreich is an Ashkenazi-Jewish surname. Notable people with the surname include:

 Arthur Goldreich (1929–2011), South African activist
 Oded Goldreich, computer scientist
 Peter Goldreich, astrophysicist
 Tova Sanhadray Goldreich, Israeli politician

German-language surnames
Jewish surnames
Yiddish-language surnames